The episcopate in Namibia is represented by the Namibian Catholic Bishops Conference of Namibia (Namibian Catholic Bishop's Conference, NCBC), established in 1996.

The NCBC is a member of the Inter-Regional Meeting of Bishops of Southern Africa (IMBISA)and Symposium of Episcopal Conferences of Africa and Madagascar (SECAM).

List of presidents of the Bishops' Conference:

1996-2002: Bonifatius Haushiku, Archbishop of Windhoek

2007 - ... : Liborius Ndumbukuti Nashenda, Archbishop of Windhoek

External links
 http://www.rcchurch.na/
 http://www.gcatholic.org/dioceses/country/NA.htm
 http://www.catholic-hierarchy.org/country/na.html 

Namibia
Catholic Church in Namibia

it:Chiesa cattolica in Namibia#Conferenza_episcopale